The 2003 AIHL season was the fourth season of the Australian Ice Hockey League (AIHL). It ran from 3 May 2003 until 29 August 2003, with the Goodall Cup finals following on 6 and 7 September 2003. The Adelaide Avalanche won the Premiership after finishing the regular season first in the league standings. The Newcastle North Stars won the Goodall Cup for the first time by defeating the Western Sydney Ice Dogs in the final.

League business 

In 2003, AIHL President Tony Lane introduced the 'top four' finals (playoff) format that replaced the one off final format used in the first three seasons of the AIHL. The new format saw the top four placed teams in the regular season standings qualify for the finals weekend where first would play fourth and second would face off against third in a single match elimination with the two winning teams advancing to the Goodall Cup final and he two losing teams advancing to the third place play-off, however this only occurred in 2003 and was dropped from the format in future years.

Regular season 

The regular season began on 3 May 2003 and ran through to 29 August 2003 before the top four teams advanced to compete in the Goodall Cup playoff series.

Standings 

The 2003 AIHL season statistics and standings are incomplete. No one source has all the information and the AIHL has not published official statistics on www.theaihl.com. The Statistics for the following table comes from Elite Prospects with the final placings coming from hockeyarchives.

The statistics for the following table comes from the Newcastle North Stars and includes double point games.

Statistics

Scoring leaders 
List shows the ten top skaters sorted by points, then goals.

Leading goaltenders 
Only the top five goaltenders, based on save percentage.

Goodall Cup playoffs 

The 2003 playoffs, known in 2003 as the 'Canadian Club On Ice Finals Series' for sponsorship reasons, was scheduled for 6 September with the Goodall Cup final and 3rd place play-off held on 7 September 2003. Following the end of the regular season the top four teams advanced to the playoff series which was held at the Sydney Ice Arena (then known as the new Sydney Glaciarium, but not to be confused with the original Sydney Glaciarium that closed in 1955) in Sydney. The series was a single game elimination with the two winning semi-finalists advancing to the Goodall Cup final and the two losing teams advancing to the third place play-off. The Goodall Cup was won by Newcastle North Stars (1st title) who defeated the Western Sydney Ice Dogs 4–1 in the final. The hosts, Sydney Bears, who were without their number one goaltender Joel Gibson for the weekend due to injury, secured third spot with a high scoring 10–5 victory over league Premiers Adelaide Avalanche.

All times are UTC+10:00

Semi-finals

3rd place

Final

References

External links 
 Australian Ice Hockey League

AIHL season
AIHL season
Australian Ice Hockey League seasons